Lygodactylus tsavoensis, the Tsavo dwarf gecko, is a species of gecko endemic to Kenya.

References

Lygodactylus
Reptiles described in 2019
Reptiles of Kenya
Endemic fauna of Kenya